Matheus Matias Ferreira (born 26 June 1998), known as Matheus Matias or simply Matheus, is a Brazilian footballer who plays for Paraná on loan from Corinthians as a striker.

Club career

ABC
Born in Natal, Rio Grande do Norte, Matheus only played futsal and seven-a-side football before being approved on a trial at ABC in 2017. Initially assigned to the youth setup, he impressed during a friendly in September and was promoted to the first team by manager Itamar Schülle.

Matheus made his professional debut on 14 October 2017, coming on as a half-time substitute in a 1–0 Série B home win against Boa Esporte. His first goal came fourteen days later, as he scored the first in a 3–0 home defeat of Londrina.

Matheus finished the campaign with two goals in ten appearances, as his side suffered relegation. The following 24 January, he scored a hat-trick in a 7–0 away routing of Baraúnas for the Campeonato Potiguar championship.

Corinthians
On 21 February 2018, after scoring ten goals in ten matches, Matheus signed a five-year contract with Série A side Corinthians. He made his debut for the club on 9 June, replacing Roger late into a 0–0 home draw against Vitória for the Série A championship.

Career statistics

Honours
ABC
Campeonato Potiguar: 2018

Corinthians
Campeonato Paulista: 2018

References

External links
 

1998 births
Living people
People from Natal, Rio Grande do Norte
Brazilian footballers
Association football forwards
Campeonato Brasileiro Série A players
Campeonato Brasileiro Série B players
ABC Futebol Clube players
Sport Club Corinthians Paulista players
Ceará Sporting Club players
Avaí FC players
Sportspeople from Rio Grande do Norte